Harry Pepl (10 September 1945  – 5 December 2005) was an Austrian jazz guitarist and composer born in Wien.

Biography 

Pepl studied classical guitar at the Universität für Musik und darstellende Kunst Wien. He oriented his musical preference to Jazz and together with Werner Pirchner first appeared as "Pirchner-Pepl-JazzZwio", which was partially expanded with Adelhard Roidinger as bassist for Trio. He also played with a series of famous jazz musicians, like Benny Goodman, Dave Holland, Enrico Rava, Wolfgang Puschnig, Steve Swallow, Jack DeJohnette, and  Michel Portal, as well as the Vienna Art Orchestra. With Mike Richmond he played between 1984 and 1986 at numerous festivals.

Between 1977 and 1995 he taught guitar at the Universität für Musik und darstellende Kunst Graz, from 1984 as professor. Pepl died on 5 December 2005 in a hospital in Wiener Neustadt, Niederösterreich.

Discography

Solo albums 
 1990: Schönberg Improvations (EmArcy Records)
 1994: N.Y.C. Impressure (Extraplatte), with Harry Pepl Quartet
 1996: Flow (PAO Records)
 2003: Live At Miles Smiles (EmArcy Records), with Werner Pirchner and Georg Polanski

Collaborations 
 1976: Leave Me (WM Produktion), with ORF Big Band Conducted By Richard Österreicher - Soloist: Harry Pepl
 1979: Tango from Obango (Art), with the Vienna Art Orchestra
 1980: Gegenwind (Mood Records), with Pirchner-Pepl-Jazzzwio
 1980: Austria Drei (EGO Records), with Werner Pirchner, Todd Canedy, and Adelhard Roidinger
 1980: Berlin 1980 (TCB Records), with Benny Goodman
 1981: Live, Montreux '81 (Wea Music), with Pirchner-Pepl-Jazzzwio
 1982: Schattseite, (ECM Records), with Adelhard Roidinger, Heinz Sauer, W. Pirchner, and Michael Di Pasqua
 1983: Werner Pirchner, Harry Pepl, Jack DeJohnette (ECM Records)
 1988: Cracked Mirrors with Herbert Joos and Jon Christensen (ECM Records)
 1994: Beginnings - Abstract Truth (AMADEO)
 2008:  Live In Concerts (EmArcy Records), with Jazzzwio
 2009: Live in Concert Montreux 1981, Innsbruck 1984 (Universal Music), with Jazzzwio (CD + DVD)

References

External links 
  in German
 "Harry Pepl gestorben" (Jazz in Österreich 6 December 2005)  in German
 JazzZwio - Harry Pepl, Werner Pirchner - new CD/DVD "JazzZwio - Live In Concerts" at TV... on YouTube in German

Lexicographical entries 
 Wolf Kampmann: Reclams Jazzlexikon Stuttgart 2003;  

1945 births
2005 deaths
Avant-garde jazz musicians
20th-century guitarists
21st-century guitarists
Austrian jazz musicians
Austrian jazz composers
Male jazz composers
Classical guitarists
20th-century male musicians
21st-century male musicians
Vienna Art Orchestra members
20th-century jazz composers